The Mill River is a  river in the town of Fairfield, Connecticut. It flows into Long Island Sound at Southport harbor.

Dams on the Mill River form the Easton, Hemlock, and Samp Mortar Lake Reservoirs and control downstream flow.

See also
List of rivers of Connecticut

References

Rivers of Fairfield County, Connecticut
Rivers of Connecticut